Peter Stephen Wilenski,  (10 May 1939 – 3 November 1994) was a senior Australian public servant and ambassador. He was a champion of women's rights and equal opportunity.

Early life
Peter Wilenski was born in Łódź, Poland on 10 May 1939. He came to Australia in 1943 as a Jewish refugee, due to World War II conflict and persecution of Jewish people in his home country. His family spent time in a Soviet internment camp before coming to Australia. For high school education, he attended Sydney Boys High School. He later studied at the University of Sydney where he met his first wife, Gail Radford, when both were student politicians.

Career
Wilenski entered the Australian Public Service as a Foreign Affairs Officer (1967–71).

Wilenski's first Secretary role was in the Department of Labor and Immigration, appointed by the Whitlam Government in March 1975 fresh from a position as private secretary to Prime Minister Gough Whitlam. Just months after his appointment, the federal opposition were promising to sack Wilenski when they were back in power. During the 1970s Wilenski was working for the United States of America in what a historian has called "a discreet relationship".

In March 1983 Wilenski was placed in his second Secretary role, this time as head of the Department of Education and Youth Affairs. His tenure at the department was a short seven months.

Wilenski was appointed Secretary of the Department of Foreign Affairs and Trade in 1992, but retired from the position in 1993 due to ill health.

Awards
In 1994, Wilenski was named a Companion of the Order of Australia for service to international relations and to public sector reform, particularly through fostering the implementation of social justice and equity principles.

Death
Wilenski died on 3 November 1994 at his home in Sydney after battling lymphatic cancer for several years.

References

Further reading

Mitcham, Chad J., Wilenski, 'Peter Stephen (1939–1994)', Australian Dictionary of Biography, National Centre of Biography, Australian National University, http://adb.anu.edu.au/biography/wilenski-peter-stephen-29978/text37160, published online 2020.

1939 births
Australian public servants
1994 deaths
Companions of the Order of Australia
Deaths from cancer in New South Wales
Polish emigrants to Australia
Secretaries of the Australian Government Immigration Department
Secretaries of the Australian Government Education Department
Permanent Representatives of Australia to the United Nations
People educated at Sydney Boys High School